The Boise School District #1 is one of 115 public school districts in Idaho. The Boise School District serves a 456 square mile area of Ada County and is headquartered in Boise, Idaho. The district was founded in 1865 under the auspices of Idaho Territory. Formerly the largest school district in the state, it now ranks second to the adjacent West Ada School District #2, which administers several schools in western Boise. Peak enrollment in the Boise School District was reached in 1997 at 27,070.

The Boise School District #1 is the second-oldest school system in Idaho. The oldest is in Lewiston, founded three years earlier by the Washington Territory government.

Current-year tax rates for all Idaho school districts are available on the Idaho State Department of Education website.

Service area 
Within Ada County the district includes most of Boise, all of Hidden Springs, most of Garden City, and a small portion of Eagle. A portion of the district extends into Boise County.

Schools

High schools

Traditional
Four senior high schools, grades 10–12, IHSAA class 5A, Southern Idaho Conference
Boise High School - (1902, 1882 as Central School)
Borah High School - (1958)
Capital High School - (1965)
Timberline High School - (1998)

The first Les Bois Junior High (1994), was remodeled and expanded in 1998 to become Timberline High School.

Alternative
Frank Church - (2008), grades 9–12
Marian Pritchett

Junior high schools
Eight junior high schools, grades 7–9, two per high school

 East Jr. High School- (1952, 2009)
 Fairmont Jr. High School - (1965)
 Hillside Jr. High School- (1960)
 Les Bois Jr. High School - (1994, 1998)
 North Jr. High School - (1937: "Boise" until South opened in 1948)
 Riverglen Jr. High School - (1998)
 South Jr. High School - (1948, 2008)
 West Jr. High School - (1952, 2008)

Prior to 1937, grades 7 and 8 were in the elementary schools.

Elementary schools
Thirty-two elementary schools, grades K–6.

Adams
Amity
Collister
Cynthia Mann
Garfield
Grace Jordan
Hawthorne
Hidden Springs
Highlands
Hillcrest
Horizon
Jefferson
Koelsch
Liberty
Longfellow
Lowell
Maple Grove
Morley Nelson
Monroe
Mountain View
Owyhee
Pierce Park
Riverside
Roosevelt
Shadow Hills
Trail Wind
Valley View
Washington
White Pine
Whitney
Whittier
William Howard Taft

Joint School District Facilities
Dennis Technical Education Center
Treasure Valley Mathematics and Science Center

References

External links 
 

School districts in Idaho
Education in Boise, Idaho
School districts established in 1865
Treasure Valley
1865 establishments in Idaho Territory